The Clay Cole Show (1959–1967) was a rock music television show based in New York City, hosted by Clay Cole.

History
First broadcast on WNTA-TV (now WNET) in September 1959 as Rate the Records, within two months the format was changed, and an hour-long Saturday-night show was added. In the summer months, the show was expanded to an hour, six nights a week, live from New Jersey's Palisades Amusement Park, where Chubby Checker first performed and danced "The Twist". When WNTA-TV was sold in 1963 the show moved to WPIX-TV, where for five years it was successful, thanks to first-time guest appearances of The Rolling Stones (on a program with one other guest act--The Beatles), Neil Diamond, Dionne Warwick, Simon & Garfunkel, Richie Havens, Tony Orlando, Blood, Sweat & Tears and The Rascals. In 1965 the show was renamed Clay Cole's Discotek. Clay produced a full hour with just one guest, Tony Bennett. Clay's all-star, ten-day Christmas Show in 1960 at the Brooklyn Paramount Theater holds the all-time box-office record for that theater.

Cole was the first to introduce stand-up comics such as Richard Pryor, George Carlin and Fannie Flagg to a teen audience. He was the first to produce a full hour of all-black performers, his historic Salute to Motown. Unlike other teen music show hosts, Cole danced to the music he played on his shows; he was also unafraid to book lesser-known performers.
 
In 1968, at the height of his show's popularity, Cole left the show, unhappy with the shift in pop music to psychedelic acid rock and heavy metal.

His memoir of the early years of rock and roll and live television, Sh-Boom! The Explosion of Rock 'n' Roll (1953-1968) has been published by Morgan James. Cole died on December 18, 2010.

See also
 The Buddy Deane Show
 The Groovy Show
 The Milt Grant Show
 John Waters
 Brooklyn Paramount Theater

References

External links
 The Clay Cole Show website
 The Jersey Girls Sing website, Clay Cole Tribute Page

1959 American television series debuts
1967 American television series endings
1950s American music television series
1960s American music television series
1950s American variety television series
1960s American variety television series
Black-and-white American television shows
Dance television shows
Local music television shows in the United States
English-language television shows
Television series about teenagers